Julius Kalanga (born April 12, 1978) is a Tanzanian politician and a member of the Chama Cha Mapinduzi political party. He was elected MP representing Monduli in 2015.

References 

1978 births
Living people
Chama Cha Mapinduzi politicians
Tanzanian MPs 2015–2020
Chama Cha Mapinduzi MPs